Lida may refer to:

Places

 Lida, Hrodna Voblast, Belarus
 Lida, Nevada, United States
 Lida Junction Airport, Nevada, United States
 Lake Lida, Otter Tail County, Minnesota, United States
 Lida Township, Minnesota, United States

People with the name
 Lida Abdul, Afghan artist
 Gwen Araujo, American murder victim nicknamed Lida
 Lisa Baday (b. 1957), Canadian fashion designer
 Nikolai Vyacheslavich Romadov, Russian musician, uses the pseudonym Lida
 Lída Baarová (1914–2000), Czech actress
 Lida E. Harkins, American politician, Massachusetts House of Representatives
 Lida Shaw King (1868–1932), American classicist
 Lida Larrimore (born 1896), American author
 Lida Rose McCabe (1865-1938), American author, journalist, lecturer
 Lida Lee Tall (1873–1942), American educator
 Lida Yusupova (born 1961), Russian activist

Education
 Lida, in Mandarin Chinese, is the colloquial name for some polytechnics and technology universities, including:
 Beijing Institute of Technology
 Hebei Polytechnic University
 Hong Kong Polytechnic University
 Lida Hooe Elementary School, Dallas, Texas, United States

Other uses
 LIDA (cognitive architecture), a cognitive architecture developed by Stan Franklin and colleagues at the University of Memphis
 Lida, brand of agricultural equipment produced by Belarus-based company Lidagroprommash
 LIDA, acronym for Linux Interactive DisAssembler
 Battle of Lida (disambiguation)

See also 
 Leda (disambiguation)